Merit Underwear Company is a historic factory building located at Shoemakersville, Berks County, Pennsylvania, USA. It was added to the front of an earlier wood-frame building, which was later replaced with a two-story, irregularly shaped brick structure built in 1928. A two-story, brick addition was built in 1921. The addition measures 52 feet by 71 feet. The building was occupied by garment manufacturers into the 1990s.

It was added to the National Register of Historic Places in 1996.

References

Industrial buildings and structures on the National Register of Historic Places in Pennsylvania
Industrial buildings completed in 1928
Buildings and structures in Berks County, Pennsylvania
1928 establishments in Pennsylvania
National Register of Historic Places in Berks County, Pennsylvania